Andreas Bach (born 10 October 1968, in Erfurt) is a German former track cyclist. He won the team pursuit at the 1994 UCI Track Cycling World Championships with Guido Fulst, Danilo Hondo and Jens Lehmann.

Major results
1986 
 2nd  Team pursuit, UCI Junior World Championships
1993
 2nd  Team pursuit, UCI World Championships
1994
 1st  Team pursuit, UCI World Championships
 1st  Team pursuit, National Track Championships

References

External links
 

1968 births
Living people
Cyclists from Thuringia
German male cyclists
Sportspeople from Erfurt
UCI Track Cycling World Champions (men)
German track cyclists
East German male cyclists
People from Bezirk Erfurt